The 1902 Connecticut Aggies football team represented Connecticut Agricultural College, now the University of Connecticut, in the 1902 college football season.  This was the seventh year that the school fielded a football team.  The Aggies were led by first year head coach Edwin O. Smith, and completed the season with a record of 4–3.

Schedule

References

Connecticut
UConn Huskies football seasons
Connecticut Aggies football